Joseph Leo "Patsy" O'Rourke Sr. (April 13, 1881 – April 18, 1956) was a Major League Baseball shortstop who played in 53 games for the 1908 St. Louis Cardinals. He later managed in the minor leagues.

References

External links

1881 births
1956 deaths
Major League Baseball shortstops
St. Louis Cardinals players
Chicago White Sox scouts
Pittsburgh Pirates scouts
Santa Clara Broncos baseball coaches
Vicksburg Hill Billies players
New London Whalers players
Waterbury Authors players
Lynn Shoemakers players
Indianapolis Indians players
Albany Senators players
Sacramento Sacts players
Sacramento Solons managers
Venice Tigers players
Wichita Witches players
Dallas Giants players
Baseball players from Philadelphia